The R822 road is a regional road in south Dublin, Ireland. The road starts at the junction with the R821 (Nutgrove Avenue) in Rathfarnham before terminating with the junction with Taylor's Lane on the R113. The road is known as Grange Road throughout.

Transport
There road is serviced by the following Dublin Bus routes:
 16
 16A

Points of interest
 Saint Enda's
 Loreto Abbey

See also
Roads in Ireland
National primary road
National secondary road

References
Roads Act 1993 (Classification of Regional Roads) Order 2006 – Department of Transport

Regional roads in the Republic of Ireland
Roads in County Dublin